Karfanaum ali As killed is a novel by Slovenian author Maja Novak. It was first published in 1998.

See also
List of Slovenian novels

Slovenian novels
1998 novels